Kota Junction railway station is major railway junction on the West Central railway network of India which serves Kota in Rajasthan. It is the headquarters of Kota railway division of West Central Railway zone.

Background
Kota is an important station on the New Delhi–Mumbai main line and has direct connectivity with all major cities in the country. More than 220 trains make a halt at the station. Many important trains originate from Kota including Patna–Kota Express, Kota-Hazrat Nizamuddin Jan Shatabdi Express, Kota-Hisar Express, Kota-Dehradun Nanda Devi Express, Kota-Shree Mata Vaishno Devi Katra Express, Damoh–Kota Passenger, Indore–Kota Intercity Express and Kota–Shri Ganganagar Superfast Express . Kota city is also served by another railway station called Dakaniya Talav station located in opposite of Rajeev Gandhi Nagar in southern part of the city.

Electrification
The Kanwalpura–Kota and Gurla–Kota sections were electrified in the financial year of 1987–88 under Western Railways.

Passenger movement
Kota is amongst the top hundred booking stations of Indian Railway.

Notes

References

External links 

Railway stations in Kota district
Railway junction stations in Rajasthan
Kota railway division
Transport in Kota, Rajasthan